Trishna was a 1985 Indian TV show on Doordarshan. The show was aired on Doordarshan in 1985. It was based on Jane Austen's 1813 novel Pride and Prejudice, and suitably adapted to an Indian middle-class family. All the characters of the novel were maintained in the show, with their traits shown exactly as in the book. The screenplay, written by Kamna Chandra is a faithful adaptation of Pride and Prejudice.

Synopsis
In the novel the family has five daughters, but in this series they have four daughters, the second of whom is called Rekha (Sangeeta Handa). She is honest, intelligent and has a lively disposition. She does not think much of those who are pompous. She meets a rich, handsome guy, Rahul (Tarun Dhanrajgir) at a party, who has gone there with his friend Ravi (Vilas Kalgutkar) and sisters. She is instantly prejudiced against him due to his pride and arrogance. The elder sister, Roopa (Aparna Sharma) falls in love with the friend Ravi, whose sisters do not think much of her family and persuade him to jilt her. The role of the youngest sister, Roohi was portrayed by Kitu Gidwani and the character of Mrs. Bennet was played by Ratna Bhushan.

Cast
 Sangeeta Handa as Rekha, the second daughter (character based on Elizabeth Bennet)
 Tarun Dhanrajgir as Rahul Mehta (character based on Mr. Darcy)
 Aparna Sharma as Roopa, the first and eldest daughter (character based on Jane Bennet)
 Vilas Kalgutkar as Ravi Chopra
 Kitu Gidwani as Roohi, the third daughter (character based on Lydia Bennet)
 Ratna Bhushan as Sushila (character based on Mrs. Bennet)
 Rishabh Shukla
 Shabana Dutt as Rita, the fourth and the youngest daughter

References

1980s Indian television series
Television series based on Pride and Prejudice
1985 Indian television series debuts
Indian drama television series
DD National original programming